Ellen Ellis may refer to:
 Ellen Elizabeth Ellis, New Zealand feminist and writer
 Ellen Deborah Ellis, American professor of history and political science